George William Pierrepont Bentinck  (17 July 1803 – 20 February 1886) was a British Conservative politician.

Background
Bentinck was the son of Vice-Admiral William Bentinck, son of Captain John Bentinck, son of Willem Bentinck van Rhoon, younger son of William Bentinck, 1st Earl of Portland. His mother was Lady Frances Augusta Eliza, daughter of Charles Pierrepont, 1st Earl Manvers.

Political career
After unsuccessfully contesting a by-election in 1843  for the borough of Kendal, Bentinck was elected to the House of Commons at his next attempt, when he was returned unopposed at the 1852 general election as one of the two Members of Parliament (MPs) for the Western division of Norfolk.  He held that seat until he stood down at the 1865 general election, but returned to Parliament at an unopposed by-election in 1871.  He resigned from the Commons in 1884.

He also served as a Deputy Lieutenant and Justice of the Peace for Norfolk.

Personal life
Bentinck died unmarried in February 1886, aged 82.

References

External links 
 

1803 births
1886 deaths
George
Conservative Party (UK) MPs for English constituencies
UK MPs 1852–1857
UK MPs 1857–1859
UK MPs 1859–1865
UK MPs 1868–1874
UK MPs 1874–1880
UK MPs 1880–1885
Deputy Lieutenants of Norfolk